ŠK Slovan Bratislava ("Bratislava Slav") is a football club based in Bratislava, Slovakia, that plays in the Slovak Super Liga. Founded as I. ČSŠK Bratislava in 1919, the club changed its name to Slovan Bratislava in 1953. Slovan is the most successful team in Slovakia with the most titles in both league and cup in the country.

Slovan Bratislava became the first and so far only club in Slovakia as well as former Czechoslovakia to win one of the European cup competitions, the Cup Winners' Cup when they defeated FC Barcelona in the final in Basel in 1969. The club also supplied seven players to the victorious UEFA Euro 1976 Czechoslovakia.

History

Historical names
 I. ČSŠK Bratislava (1919–1939)
 ŠK Bratislava (1939–1948)
 ZSJ Sokol NV Bratislava (1948–1952)
 DŠO Slovan ÚNV Bratislava (1953–1956)
 TJ Slovan ÚNV Bratislava (1957–1961)
 TJ Slovan Bratislava Dimitrov (1961)
 TJ Slovan CHZJD Bratislava (1961–1990)
 ŠK Slovan Bratislava (1990–present)

1919–1944: Early years
Slovan was officially founded on 3 May 1919 as I. ČSŠK Bratislava (the First CzechoSlovak Sports Club Bratislava). The first president was Police Captain Richard Brunner, who arranged the club's first temporary training ground at Kuchajda (Pasienky). The club soon moved to Petržalka. 

I. ČsŠK became the champions of Slovakia in 1922. Notable players from the early era were Pavol Šoral, Štefan Čambal and Štefan Priboj. In the spring of 1938 anti-Jewish sentiments penetrated into the club, and the victim was coach József Braun, who was one of the many Bratislava inhabitants who had to involuntarily leave the city. Under the terms of the 1938 Munich agreement Czechoslovakia was dissolved, leading to the emergence of the Slovak Republic. At this point the club name was changed to ŠK Bratislava. On 26 September 1940 ŠK Bratislava played its first game at the new stadium, Tehelné pole.

The first international meeting at the new venue was on 27 October 1940, when ŠK Bratislava and Hertha Berlin played out a 2–2 draw. In the separate Slovak league, ŠK Bratislava won the title four times in the period from 1939 to 1945. Slovan was the first Czechoslovak team to use the WM formation. The team's first foreign opponent after World War II was Ferencvárosi TC. ŠK Bratislava lost 1–0, but won the Central European Cup 2–1 over Hungary before 20,000 spectators at Tehelnom field. In this period former players of I. ČSŠK Bratislava Ferdinand Daučík and Leopold "Jim" Šťastný served as coaches for ŠK Bratislava.

1945–1993: Czechoslovak League
The team name changed again in 1948, to Sokol NV Bratislava. The team met with success in 1949, when they became the first champions of the re-formed Czechoslovakia. Outstanding players from this era included Emil Pažický, Gejza Šimanský, Bozhin Laskov, Viktor Tegelhoff, and Teodor Reimann.

Anton Bulla, the coach in 1953, added eight new players to team. In 1961–62 the team defeated Red Star Bratislava in the national league for the title. Under the influence of political and economic pressures and interests, TJ ÚNV Slovan and TJ Dimitrov merged to create CHZJD Slovan Bratislava on 5 August 1961 (CHZJD stood for the Juraj Dimitrov Chemical Plant).

1962 was a successful year, as the Czechoslovakia national team were defeated 3–1 in the 1962 FIFA World Cup Final in Chile, obtaining the silver, and repeating the success of the 1934 FIFA World Cup Final in Rome. Slovan players included goalkeeper Viliam Schrojf and defender Ján Popluhár.

Slovan ended the 1967–68 season second in the league, won the cup in Czechoslovakia, and participated in the UEFA Cup Winners' Cup. The team was managed by former Slovan player Michal Vičan, who focused on fast and simple games. Vičan took the team on a winter tour of Argentina in 1969.

In 1970 the Czechoslovak squad sent to the FIFA World Cup in Mexico included seven players from Slovan: Alexander Vencel, Ján Zlocha, Ivan Hrdlička, Karol Jokl, Ján Čapkovič, Vladimír Hrivnák, and Alexander Horváth. Jozef Vengloš was the coach of the Slovan Bratislava team for part of this era, as well as performing duties coaching at the international level.

In 1976 a Czechoslovakian team including six Slovan players won the European title in the European Championships held in Belgrade. Gold medals were given to coach Vengloš, Alexander Vencel, Jozef Čapkovič, Koloman Gogh, Marián Masný, Anton Ondruš, Ján Pivarník, and Ján Švehlík.  From the 1977–78 season Slovan were declining. In the 1984–85 season Slovan, led by coaches Ján Hucko and Jozef Obert, left the highest level of competition and were relegated to the Slovakian National League.

After three seasons spent in the Slovakian National League, Slovan Bratislava were able to return to national competition. In season 1987–88 the team returned to the top leagues under the leadership of coaches Ján Zachar and Jozef Jankech, who later coached the Slovak national team. Dušan Galis was the coach from 1977 to 1981. In 1991–92 Slovan Bratislava won the Czechoslovak title for the last time. Among the stars on the team were Peter Dubovský, Dušan Tittel, Ladislav Pecko, Vladimir Kinder, Miloš Glonek, Tomáš Stúpala, and Alexander Vencel (junior).

1969: Cup Winners' Cup champions

On 21 May 1969, the team defeated FC Barcelona in the 1969 European Cup Winners' Cup Final by a score of 3–2, which is the biggest success in the club's history so far.

1993–present: Slovak League
Slovan won titles in the Slovak league in the 1993–94, 1994–95 and 1995–96 seasons. For the next two years, MFK Košice won the title. Slovan returned to the Slovak throne in the 1998–99 season. The stars of the team included coach Stanislav Griga and players Róbert Tomaschek, Miroslav König, Stanislav Varga, Tibor Jančula, and Ladislav Pecko. In the next few years the club's performance was below par and they were in trouble financially. They were forced to sell some of their best players. At the end of the 2003–04 season, the team was relegated to the Slovak Second League, where they spent two seasons.  After two years, in the 2010–11 season Slovan won the double with coach Karel Jarolím.

Grounds

1940–2009: Old Tehelné pole

Tehelné pole, Slovan's previous stadium, was built during the first Slovak Republic, when Nazi Germany occupied Petržalka in 1938 and Bratislava lost almost all of its sporting facilities. The construction lasted from 1939 to 1944 and the stadium became home ground for Slovan Bratislava. The stadium was officially opened in September 1940 with 25,000 places, and the first international match was played on 27 October 1940, with Slovan Bratislava playing against Hertha Berlin, ending in 2–2 tie. The old stadium underwent reconstruction in 1961, which added second tribune, boosting its capacity to 45,000 and modernising by adding score table, artificial light and revamping the field. However, the stadium could hold up even 50,000 spectators, and just before breakup of Czechoslovakia, it was the largest one in use (Strahov Stadium in Prague had a capacity of 220,000 but was disused in the 1990s) and was the home ground for Czechoslovak national team.
The stadium was reconstructed once more in the 1990s to the "all-seater" stadium, reducing the capacity into 30,000. The last match at the old Tehelné pole stadium was played in November 2009.

2009–2018: Pasienky

During the demolition of the old Tehelné pole, the planning of the construction of the new stadium and during the construction itself, the Pasienky Stadium became the temporary home ground for Slovan.

2019–present: New Tehelné pole

In September 2016, after many years of negotiations and discussions, the building of the new stadium begun. The new stadium was opened on 3 March 2019 with a ceremony before the derby match against Spartak Trnava. The new stadium was built at the same place where Slovan has had its original home. It is a locality, which is typically connected with sports activities in Bratislava. The capacity of the new stadium is 22,500 spectators and fulfils UEFA 4-star category criteria.

Support

The main ultras group is called Ultras Slovan or Sektor C - according to the section in which they are situated during home matches. Previously, the main ultras group was called Belasá šlachta (Sky-blue aristocracy). The major hooligan firm is called Ultras Slovan Pressburg.

Slovan supporters maintain friendly relations with fans of Zbrojovka Brno, Austria Wien, as well as Polish club Wisła Kraków.

Rivalries

Slovan's greatest rival is Spartak Trnava. The derby is the most prestigious match in the Slovak football calendar.

Matches against DAC Dunajská Streda are not considered derbies, but in general they are the second most prestigious fixture in the Slovak league after the traditional derby.

Slovan's major rival teams in Bratislava were Inter Bratislava and Petržalka. The rivalry between Slovan and Inter had a long and rich history as both teams played in the Czechoslovak First League. The rivalry with Petržalka peaked after 2000.

On the international scene, Slovan's rivals are mainly clubs from neighboring countries. Namely, Sparta Prague (Federal Derby), Rapid Wien or Ferencváros.

Honours

Domestic
 Slovakia
 Slovak League / Slovak Super Liga (1926–1933; 1939–1944; 1993–present)
  Winners (20): 1926, 1927, 1930, 1932, 1940, 1941, 1942, 1944, 1993–94, 1994–95, 1995–96, 1998–99, 2008–09, 2010–11, 2012–13, 2013–14, 2018–19, 2019–20, 2020–21, 2021–22 
  Runners-up (5): 2000–01, 2009–10, 2015–16, 2016–17, 2017–18
 Slovak Cup (1969–present) 
  Winners (17): 1969–70, 1971–72, 1973–74, 1975–76, 1981–82, 1982–83, 1988–89, 1993–94, 1996–97, 1998–99, 2009–10, 2010–11, 2012–13, 2016–17, 2017–18, 2019–20, 2020–21
  Runners-up (6): 1970–71, 1977–78, 2002–03, 2013–14, 2015–16, 2021–22
 Slovak Super Cup (1993–2016)
  Winners: (4) 1994, 1996, 2009, 2014
  Runners-up (3): 1995, 1997, 2010

 Czechoslovakia
 Czechoslovak First League (1935–1938; 1945–1993)
  Winners (8): 1949, 1950, 1951, 1955, 1969–70, 1973–74, 1974–75, 1991–92
  Runners-up (10): 1952, 1956, 1959–60, 1963–64, 1966–67, 1967–68, 1968–69, 1971–72, 1975–76, 1990–91
 Czechoslovak Cup (1960–1993)
  Winners (5): 1961–62, 1962–63, 1967–68, 1973–74, 1981–82
  Runners-up (6): 1964–65, 1969–70, 1971–72, 1975–76, 1982–83, 1988–89
 1.SNL (1st Slovak National football league) (1969–1993)
  Winners: 1987–88

European
 UEFA Cup Winners' Cup
  Winners: 1968–69
 Mitropa Cup
  Runners-up: 1964

Results

Detailed seasons

Key to colours and symbols:

Key to league record:
 Pld = Matches played
 W = Matches won
 D = Matches drawn
 L = Matches lost
 GF = Goals scored
 GA = Goals against
 Pts = Points
 % = Percentage of points earned out of the total possible number of points
 Pos = Final position

Key to cup record:
 NH = Not held
 QR = Qualifying round
 QR1 = First qualifying round
 QR2 = Second qualifying round, etc.
 PO = Play-off round
 GS = Group stage
 R1 = First round
 R2 = Second round, etc.
 R16 = Round of 16
 QF = Quarter-finals
 SF = Semi-finals
 RU = Runners-up
 W = Winners

Slovak League era only (1993–present)
Table correct as of 12 March 2023

European record

UEFA ranking
UEFA coefficient ranking as of 17 March 2023:

Full list

Players

Current squad

For recent transfers, see List of Slovak football transfers winter 2022–23

Out on loan

Personnel

Coaching staff

Management

Kit suppliers and shirt sponsors

Player records

Most goals (only domestic league goals)

Players whose name is listed in bold are still active.

Czechoslovak and Slovak top goalscorer
The Czechoslovak League top scorer from 1944 to 1945 until 1992–93. Since the 1993–94 Slovak League top scorer.

Transfers
Slovan have produced numerous players who have gone on to represent the Slovak national football team. Over the last period there has been a steady increase of young players leaving Slovan after a few years of first team football and moving on to play football in leagues of a higher standard, with the German Bundesliga (best scorer Róbert Vittek to 1. FC Nürnberg in 2003), English Premier League (Vladimír Kinder to Middlesbrough in 1997, Stanislav Varga to Sunderland in 2000, Igor Bališ to West Bromwich in 2000), Turkish Süper Lig (Marko Milinković to Gençlerbirliği S.K. in 2016, Ľubomír Meszároš to Elazığspor in 2002, Marián Zeman to İstanbulspor A.Ş. in 1995), Italy (Marek Hamšík to Brescia Calcio in 2004), Spanish La Liga (Samuel Slovák to CD Tenerife in 1997 and Peter Dubovský to Real Madrid C.F. for 110mil SKK (4.3mil €) in 1993). Other interesting transfers were Dušan Tittel to Nîmes Olympique in 1992, Igor Demo to PSV Eindhoven in 1997, Róbert Tomaschek to Heart of Midlothian F.C. in 2000, Kornel Saláta to FC Rostov in 2011 and Branislav Niňaj to Lokeren in 2015. The top transfer was agreed in 2020 when 25 years old striker and previous season topscorer Andraž Šporar joined Portugal team Sporting CP for a fee more than €7.0 million, which was the highest ever paid to a Slovak club.

Record departures

Record arrivals

See also
 List of ŠK Slovan Bratislava seasons
 List of ŠK Slovan Bratislava managers
 List of ŠK Slovan Bratislava players
 ŠK Slovan Bratislava in European football

References

External links
 Slovan Bratislava official website 
 Slovan TV 

 
Bratislava, Slovan
Bratislava, Slovan
Association football clubs established in 1919
Bratislava, Slovan
1919 establishments in Slovakia
Bratislava, Slovan
Br